Stadion dr. Antoine Maduro is a multi-use stadium in Willemstad, Curaçao.  It is currently used mostly for football matches and is the home stadium of S.V. SUBT. It has a capacity of 7,000 spectators. It is located on Vesuviusstraat, a road off Dr. Martin Luther King Boulevard, to the south of the main harbor in  Willemstad.

References 
https://web.archive.org/web/20140223215217/http://www.subt.cw/index.php/en/fbh-pa
https://web.archive.org/web/20130423010935/http://subt.cw/index.php/en/

See also 
 S.V. S.U.B.T.

Football venues in Curaçao
Curacao
Buildings and structures in Willemstad